Patrick Bosco McFadden (born 26 March 1965) is a British politician serving as Shadow Chief Secretary to the Treasury since 2021. A member of the Labour Party, he has served as Member of Parliament (MP) for Wolverhampton South East since 2005.

McFadden attended the Cabinet of Prime Minister Gordon Brown as Minister of State for Business, Innovation and Skills from 2009 to 2010, deputy to Secretary of State for Business, Innovation and Skills Peter Mandelson. He was Minister of State for Employment Relations and Postal Affairs from 2007 to 2009, and Parliamentary Secretary for the Cabinet Office from 2006 to 2007. Prior to his election to Parliament, he was an aide to Tony Blair and served as his Political Secretary during his premiership.

In opposition, he served as Shadow Secretary of State for Business, Innovation and Skills in the first Shadow Cabinet of Harriet Harman from May to October 2010. Unsuccessfully elected in the 2010 Shadow Cabinet election, he was appointed Shadow Minister for Europe by Ed Miliband in 2014 and re-appointed by Jeremy Corbyn in 2015. McFadden was sacked from the front bench by Corbyn in 2016, and remained on the back benches until he was appointed Shadow Economic Secretary to the Treasury in 2020 by Keir Starmer. He was promoted to the shadow cabinet in 2021 as Shadow Chief Secretary to the Treasury.

Early life and career
McFadden was born in Paisley in Renfrewshire, Scotland. He is the son of Annie and James McFadden, both native Irish language speakers from the Falcarragh area in Cloughaneely, a district in the north of County Donegal in Ulster, Ireland. As a child, he regularly visited County Donegal. He went to Holy Cross RC Primary School on Calder Street and Holyrood Secondary School in Crosshill, south-east Glasgow. McFadden studied Politics at the University of Edinburgh, gaining an undergraduate Master of Arts (MA Hons) degree in 1988, and was chair of Scottish Labour Students in 1986–87 before becoming a researcher in 1988 for Donald Dewar, then Labour's Scottish Affairs spokesman. In 1993 he left this role to become a speechwriter and policy adviser to the Labour leader John Smith.

Prior to becoming an MP, he worked in several advisory roles for Tony Blair, both in opposition and government, and was the Prime Minister's Political Secretary from 2002.

Parliamentary career
McFadden was elected as the MP for Wolverhampton South East at the 2005 general election, with a majority of 10,495, after Dennis Turner retired.

In the 2006 reshuffle he was appointed as Parliamentary Secretary for the Cabinet Office. In the 2007 reshuffle he was promoted to Minister of State in the then newly created Department for Business, Enterprise and Regulatory Reform with responsibility for Employment Relations and Postal Affairs.  In October 2008, when Lord Mandelson replaced John Hutton as Business Secretary, McFadden took on duties as his deputy in order to represent the department in the House of Commons as Mandelson is a peer and can only address the Lords. McFadden was contemporaneously appointed to the Privy Council.

Following Labour's defeat in the 2010 election and the resignation of Gordon Brown, McFadden was named in interim leader Harriet Harman's shadow cabinet as Shadow Business Secretary.

When Ed Miliband was elected as Labour leader in September 2010, McFadden announced his decision to stand in Labour's shadow cabinet election but was not elected. However, when he reshuffled his Shadow Cabinet in 2014, Miliband appointed him as shadow minister for Europe.

In the 2015 Labour Party leadership election, he nominated Liz Kendall.

He retained his post when Jeremy Corbyn became Labour leader but was sacked along with Michael Dugher in January 2016. He was sacked for what the leadership described as repeated acts of disloyalty, including when, responding to a Stop the War article on the Paris bombings, he condemned "the view that sees terrorist acts as always being a response or a reaction to what we in the west do". John McDonnell said that McFadden's remarks, expressed in a question to the Prime Minister and interpreted as an attack on Corbyn, were an example of him undermining the leader's view. McFadden was defended by Ian Austin and Chris Leslie. Jonathan Reynolds and Stephen Doughty expressed support for McFadden in their resignation letters the following day.

He supported Owen Smith in the failed attempt to replace Jeremy Corbyn in the 2016 Labour leadership election.

He voted in favour of the European Union (Notification of Withdrawal) Bill to trigger Article 50 and exit the European Union. He was opposed to a no deal Brexit and supports a close trading relationship with the European Union. He was in favour of a second referendum to give the people a final say on leaving the European Union.

He is part of Open Britain (a British pro-European campaign group) and defended Tony Blair's pro-European speech in February 2017. He is associated with the Labour centre-left Labour First grouping and is a vice-chair of Labour Friends of Israel.

On 9 April 2020, McFadden was appointed as Shadow Economic Secretary to the Treasury by new party leader Keir Starmer. He was promoted to Shadow Chief Secretary to the Treasury in the November 2021 shadow cabinet reshuffle.

Personal life
McFadden and his wife, Marianna, have a son and a daughter. He is a supporter of Celtic F.C.

References

External links
 Pat McFadden Official website
 
 Pat McFadden Profile Department for Business, Enterprise and Regulatory Reform – From The National Archives
 Pat McFadden: Electoral history and profile The Guardian
 BBC Politics

News items
 Hugh Muir Diary The Guardian, 19 May 2009
 Baby boy for city MP Pat Express & Star, 16 May 2009
 Unions 'too quiet on Labour wins' BBC News, 25 March 2009
 Pat McFadden interview Politics Show, BBC News, 1 June 2008
 Bus boosts minimum wage campaign BBC News, 10 January 2008

|-

|-

|-

|-

1965 births
Living people
Alumni of the University of Edinburgh
Labour Party (UK) MPs for English constituencies
Labour Party (UK) officials
Labour Friends of Israel
Members of the Privy Council of the United Kingdom
People educated at Holyrood Secondary School
Politicians from Paisley, Renfrewshire
Scottish people of Irish descent
Scottish Roman Catholics
Scottish special advisers
UK MPs 2005–2010
UK MPs 2010–2015
UK MPs 2015–2017
UK MPs 2017–2019
UK MPs 2019–present